Michaël Denard (5 November 1944 – 17 February 2023) was a German-born French dancer and stage actor.

Biography
Born in Dresden on 5 November 1944 to a German mother and French father, Denard lived in his hometown during its bombardment. He began dancing in the corps de ballet of the Capitole de Toulouse in 1963 and for the Opéra national de Lorraine in 1964. At the end of 1966, he joined the Paris Opera Ballet, where he quickly rose through the ranks. On 19 December 1969, he danced with Lynn Seymour in Swan Lake at the Deutsche Oper Berlin.

Denard briefly worked in television and cinema. He was also the first guest to appear on Maritie and Gilbert Carpentier's show, .

Denard retired from ballet in 1989 and began to take on dancing roles as an actor, such as Le Martyre de saint Sébastien directed by Robert Wilson.

Michaël Denard died on 17 February 2023, at the age of 78.

Filmography

Film
 (1987)

Television
Chouette, chat, chien… show (1980)
 (1988)
 (1995)

Distinctions
Knight of the Legion of Honour
Officer of the Ordre des Arts et des Lettres
Officer of the Ordre national du Mérite (2004)

References

1944 births
2023 deaths
Actors from Dresden
German people of French descent
Recipients of the Legion of Honour
Officiers of the Ordre des Arts et des Lettres
Officers of the Ordre national du Mérite